Gerrit Glomser (born 1 April 1975 in Salzburg) is an Austrian former racing cyclist, who currently works as a directeur sportif for UCI Continental team . He turned professional in 1998, and won the Austrian National Road Race Championships in 2005.

Major results

1992
 9th Road race, UCI Juniors Road World Championships
1995
 3rd Road race, National Road Championships
1997
 1st Trofeo Città di Brescia
 3rd  Road race, UCI Under-23 Road World Championships
 3rd  Road race, UEC European Under-23 Road Championships
1998
 4th Giro della Romagna
 9th Grand Prix Pino Cerami
1999
 8th Coppa Bernocchi
2000
 1st  National Cyclo-cross Championships
 1st Stage 6 Tour of Austria
 9th Coppa Ugo Agostoni
2001
 2nd Road race, National Road Championships
 8th Overall Tour of Austria
 8th Stausee-Rundfahrt Klingnau
2002
 1st Overall Tour of Austria
1st Stage 3
 6th Gran Premio de Llodio
 9th Coppa Ugo Agostoni
2003
 1st Overall Tour of Austria
1st Stages 2 & 3
 2nd National Cyclo-cross Championships
 5th Milano–Torino
 7th Japan Cup
2004
 1st Stage 4 Tour of Austria
 3rd Trofeo Città di Castelfidardo
2005
 1st  Road race, National Road Championships
2006
 3rd National Cyclo-cross Championships
 8th Overall Tour of Austria
2007
 7th Overall Tour of Austria
1st Stage 6
 7th GP Triberg-Schwarzwald
 7th Münsterland Giro
 8th Overall Tour de Suisse

References

External links
 Eurosport.com profile
 Sample biometric data

Austrian male cyclists
1975 births
Living people
Olympic cyclists of Austria
Cyclists at the 2000 Summer Olympics
Cyclists at the 2004 Summer Olympics
Sportspeople from Salzburg